Black Wind is a 1964 Mexican drama film directed by Servando González. It was screened at the San Francisco Film Festival and the Melbourne International Film Festival. The film was selected as the Mexican entry for the Best Foreign Language Film at the 39th Academy Awards, but was not accepted as a nominee.

Cast
 David Reynoso as Manuel Iglesias
 José Elías Moreno as Lorenzo Montes
 Eleazar García as Picuy
 Enrique Aguilar as Ingeniero Antonio López
 Roberto Cobo as Ingeniero Carlos Jiménez
 Rodolfo Landa as Ingeniero Fernández
 Enrique Lizalde as Jorge Iglesias
 Fernando Luján as Ingeniero Julio
 Jorge Martínez de Hoyos as Ulalio
 Marianela Peña as La Venada
 Miguel Suárez as Funcionario
 José Torvay as Nabor Camargo
Aarón Hernán

See also
 List of submissions to the 39th Academy Awards for Best Foreign Language Film
 List of Mexican submissions for the Academy Award for Best Foreign Language Film

References

External links
 

1964 films
1964 drama films
1960s Spanish-language films
Mexican black-and-white films
Mexican drama films
Films set in deserts
Films directed by Servando González
1960s Mexican films